Setenuten Peak is a rock peak, 2,745 m, standing one nautical mile (1.9 km) south of Petrellfjellet in the Muhlig-Hofmann Mountains, Queen Maud Land. It has been mapped by Norwegian cartographers from surveys and air photos by the Norwegian Antarctic Expedition (1956–60), and it is named Setenuten (the seat peak) because of its shape.

Mountains of Queen Maud Land
Princess Martha Coast